Adil Abdullah (1 January 1923 – 1 July 1986) was an Iraqi with Turkish origin international footballer who played as a forward.

He earned five caps and scored five goals for Iraq, with all five goals coming during 1960 Olympics qualification against Lebanon.

Career statistics

International goals
Scores and results list Iraq's goal tally first.

References

1923 births
1986 deaths
Iraqi footballers
Sportspeople from Baghdad
Association football forwards
Iraq international footballers